Prestressed concrete cylinder pipe (PCCP) is a common variety of large-diameter concrete pressure pipe used for transporting water and wastewater.  PCCP is typical manufactured according to the American Water Works Association (AWWA) standard C304.

References

Structural engineering standards
Plumbing
Drainage